Song of the Drifter is a 1948 American Western film directed by Lambert Hillyer and written by Frank H. Young. The film stars Jimmy Wakely, Dub Taylor, Mildred Coles, William Ruhl, Marshall Reed and Patsy Moran. The film was released on January 17, 1948, by Monogram Pictures.

Plot

Cast          
Jimmy Wakely as Jimmy Wakely
Dub Taylor as Cannonball 
Mildred Coles as Martha Fennamore
William Ruhl as Philip Judson
Marshall Reed as Easy
Patsy Moran as Aunt Martha Fennamore
Frank LaRue as Turner
Steve Clark as Sheriff
Wheaton Chambers as Doctor
Bud Osborne as Eph
Bob Woodward as Joe
Dick Reinhart as Dick
Fiddlin' Arthur Smith as Art
Cliffie Stone as Cliff

References

External links
 

1948 films
American Western (genre) films
1948 Western (genre) films
Monogram Pictures films
Films directed by Lambert Hillyer
American black-and-white films
1940s English-language films
1940s American films